Peter J. Uggowitzer (born 24 November 1950 in Klagenfurt in Austria) is an Austrian-Swiss metallurgist and materials scientist.

Academic life 
Uggowitzer studied materials science at the Montanuniversität Leoben until 1976, and earned his doctorate there in 1981 in the field of dual-phase steels. Subsequently, he transferred to ETH Zurich, where he earned his habilitation in 1993 and became a professor in 1996.

His scientific work includes Ni-free austenitic steels, which have found wide application in medicine and watch industries. He has also published significant works on the aging behavior of Al-Mg-Si alloys and on magnesium alloys.

In 2019, Uggowitzer and co-authors discovered that the phenomenon of ageing of aluminium alloys does not occur at the atomic scale. In late 2020, Uggowitzer and co-authors initiated the research field of radiation-resistant aluminium alloys for future space exploration.

Uggowitzer is married and the father of three adult children.

Awards 

 1987: Masing Memorial Prize of the German Society for Materials Science (Deutsche Gesellschaft für Materialkunde)
 2014: Tammann Commemorative Medal of the German Society for Materials Science (Deutsche Gesellschaft für Materialkunde)

References 

1950 births
Living people
Scientists from Klagenfurt
ETH Zurich alumni
Academic staff of ETH Zurich
Austrian metallurgists
University of Leoben alumni